Mariya Koryttseva and Raluca Olaru were the defending champions but Olaru decided not to participate.
Koryttseva played alongside Darija Jurak but lost in the quarterfinals to Gisela Dulko and Paola Suárez.
Sara Errani and Roberta Vinci defeated Lourdes Domínguez Lino and Arantxa Parra Santonja 6–2, 6–1 in the final to win the title.

Seeds

Draw

Draw

References
 Main Draw

Samsung Abierto Mexicano Telcel - Doubles
2012 Abierto Mexicano Telcel